K. A. Sengottaiyan (born 9 January 1948) is an Indian politician. He is the former Minister for School Education in the Government of Tamil Nadu. He also served as the party presidium chairman of the All India Anna Dravida Munnetra Kazhagam. He is currently the longest serving ADMK MLA along with his opposition counterpart Duraimurugan.

He is an incumbent Member of the Legislative Assembly of Tamil Nadu from Gobichettipalayam constituency in Erode district. Previously, he was elected to the Tamil Nadu legislative assembly as an All India Anna Dravida Munnetra Kazhagam candidate from Sathyamangalam constituency in 1977 election and from Gobichettipalayam constituency in 1980, 1984, 1989 (Jayalalitha faction), 1991, 2006, 2011 and 2016.

Sengottaiyan was the Minister for Transport from 1991 to 1996 during the first tenure of Jayalalithaa cabinet. He was again the Minister for Agriculture until November 2011 when a cabinet reshuffle by Jayalalithaa resulted in that portfolio being given to S. Damodaran and Sengottaiyan taking over the Information Technology portfolio from R. B. Udhaya Kumar.

From 2001 to 2012, He served as the headquarters secretary of the All India Anna Dravida Munnetra Kazhagam.

In February 2017, following the appointment of Edappadi K. Palaniswami as the Chief Minister in place of O. Paneerselvam, Sengottaiyan replaced K. Pandiarajan as the Minister for School Education. Pandiarajan was the only cabinet minister to have supported Paneerselvam during a party dispute in which V. K. Sasikala was being touted as a possible Chief Minister. The appointment of Sengottaiyan was the only change made to the cabinet by Palaniswami at that time. He allegedly punched the former Tamil Nadu CM Karunanidhi in his face during the infamous 1989 violent clash in assembly.

Elections contested and results

References 

All India Anna Dravida Munnetra Kazhagam politicians
Tamil Nadu politicians
21st-century Indian politicians
Living people
1948 births
People from Erode district
People from Gobichettipalayam
State cabinet ministers of Tamil Nadu
Tamil Nadu MLAs 1977–1980
Tamil Nadu MLAs 1980–1984
Tamil Nadu MLAs 1985–1989
Tamil Nadu MLAs 1989–1991
Tamil Nadu MLAs 1991–1996
Tamil Nadu MLAs 2001–2006
Tamil Nadu MLAs 2006–2011
Tamil Nadu MLAs 2011–2016
Tamil Nadu MLAs 2016–2021
Tamil Nadu MLAs 2021–2026